"People Need Love" is the debut single recorded in March 1972 by Swedish pop group ABBA, at the time known as 'Björn & Benny, Agnetha & Anni-Frid'. The song was on the group's first album, Ring Ring, released in 1973.

Track listing
 A. "People Need Love" - 2:45
 B. "Merry-Go-Round (En karusell)" - 3:24

Composition
As the majority of ABBA songs were, "People Need Love" was written and composed by the two male band members, Benny Andersson and Björn Ulvaeus. It was engineered by Michael Tretow who aimed to create a Phil Spector-like wall of sound on the recording. The song begins in the key of B major and modulates up to C♯ major for the final chorus.

Although their debut album did not bring them to global attention, it follows some standards of ABBA's style. The ballad is about what people can give each other to make their lives easier and create a better world.

Reception
The basic aim of the "People Need Love" single was not to promote the quartet, since all four individuals had other commitments and did not have the time to form a permanent group (an example of this is the crediting; the single in most of the territories is credited to "Björn & Benny, Agnetha & Anni-Frid"), but to promote the "Björn & Benny" duo, which was the singing and songwriting partnership of the two men. The women were simply guesting on the new "Björn & Benny" single. However, the very positive audience reaction was unexpected.

"People Need Love" made the top 20 of the combined Swedish singles and albums chart, and reached No. 3 on the popular Swedish radio chart show, Tio i topp (The Top Ten). It was the foursome's first charting record in the United States, where it peaked at No. 114 on the Cashbox singles chart and No. 117 on the Record World singles chart. The Playboy Records U.S. release was credited to "Bjorn & Benny (with Svenska Flicka)", and according to ABBA's manager Stig Anderson, could have been a much bigger American hit, if not for the limited distribution resources of the label that was unable to meet the demand from retailers and radio programmers.

At the time of the single's release, the Ring Ring album had not been planned, since there was no intention to form a permanent group. However, the song was included on the album the following year. Although recorded earlier than most of the album, it can retroactively be considered the lead single from Ring Ring.

In the Netherlands and Belgium, the single had its release in August 1973 as the follow-up to the highly successful single "Ring Ring". It however performed rather badly, reaching just No. 47 on the Radio Noordzee Top 50 from the Dutch service of Radio North Sea International.

Personnel 
 Agnetha Fältskog – lead and backing vocals
 Anni-Frid Lyngstad – lead and backing vocals
 Björn Ulvaeus – acoustic guitar, lead and backing vocals

 Benny Andersson – piano, keyboards, lead and backing vocals

Additional musicians 
 Ola Brunkert – drums
 Mike Watson – bass
 Janne Schaffer – electric guitar

Chart history

Cover versions
A Swedish country band called Nashville Train (which included some of ABBA's own backing band members) covered the song in 1977 on their album ABBA Our Way, released on the Polar Music label in Sweden.

References

External links
 1972 television appearance at YouTube

1972 songs
1972 debut singles
ABBA songs
Songs written by Benny Andersson and Björn Ulvaeus
Playboy Records singles
Polar Music singles
Song recordings with Wall of Sound arrangements